His Majesty's Young Offender Institution (or HMYOI) is a type of prison in Great Britain, intended for offenders aged up to 18, although some prisons cater for younger offenders from ages 15 to 17, who are classed as juvenile offenders. Typically those aged under 15 will be held in a Secure Children's Home and those over 15 will be held in either a Young Offender Institution or Secure Training Centre. A person is a young offender until they become 18, where they will be sent to an adult prison or can remain in the YOI until they turn 21 if deemed appropriate.

Background

Young Offender Institutions were introduced under the Criminal Justice Act 1988, but special centres for housing young offenders have existed since the beginning of the 20th century: the first borstal opened at Borstal, Kent in 1902.

The regime of a Young Offender Institution is much the same as that of an adult prison. However, there are some slight differences, notably the lower staff-to-offender ratio. Prisoners serving sentences at Young Offender Institutions are expected to take part in at least 25 hours of education per week, aimed at helping them to improve their behaviour, to develop practical skills for use in the outside world and to prepare them for lawful employment following their release. There are also opportunities for prisoners to undertake work in Community Service Volunteer programmes.  

Violence can occur often in Young Offender Institutions. Some believe that staff do not always do enough to prevent violence. Inmates are often locked in cells for up to 21 hours a day and given little tuition or guidance. Three quarters of offenders released from Young Offender Institutions re-offend within a year. The use of isolation for young offenders is increasing though this is considered bad for their mental health.  At all YOIs during six-month there were 306 cases of segregation lasting over a week, which is "very high". Gang involvement, levels of prison staff and lack of NHS mental health beds may cause the rise in segregation.

Offenders undergo risk assessments to assess the likeliness of reoffending. This assessment is known as Youth level of service.

List of Young Offender Institutions

 HMP Woodhill
 HMYOI Altcourse
 HMYOI Aylesbury
 HMYOI Deerbolt
 HMYOI Huntercombe
 HMYOI Onley
 HMYOI Polmont
 HMYOI Portland
 HMYOI Rochester
 HMYOI Stoke Heath
 HMYOI Swinfen Hall
 HMYOI Thorn Cross
 HMYOI Werrington
 HMYOI Wetherby

and 23 which share their site with other penal establishments:

 HMP & YOI Askham Grange
 HMP & YOI Brinsford
 HMP & YOI Brockhill
 HMP & YOI Bronzefield
 HMP & YOI Castington
 HMP & YOI Chelmsford
 HMP & YOI Durham
 HMP & YOI East Sutton Park
 HMP & YOI Elmley
 HMP & YOI Feltham
 HMP & YOI Guys Marsh
 HMP & YOI Hatfield
 HMP & YOI Hindley
 HMP & YOI Hollesley Bay
 HMP & YOI Low Newton
 HMP & YOI Moorland
 HMP & YOI New Hall
 HMP & YOI Norwich
 HMP & YOI Reading
 HMP & YOI Warren Hill
 HMP/RC & YOI Exeter
 HMYOI & RC Glen Parva
 HMP & YOI Winchester

See also 

 His Majesty's Prison Service
 Young offender
 Borstal
 Youth detention centre

References 

Penal system in England
 
Penal system in Wales
1988 establishments in England
1988 establishments in Wales
1988 in law
Government agencies established in 1988